Thomas Moore (1759July 11, 1822) was a member of the United States House of Representatives and planter from South Carolina.

Born in the Spartanburg District of the Province of South Carolina, Moore served during the Revolutionary War, taking part in the Battle of Cowpens at the age of 16. He served in the South Carolina House of Representatives to 1794 to 1799. In 1800, he was elected a Democratic-Republican to the seventh congress, serving from 1801 to 1813. He served as a brigadier general in the War of 1812 and afterwards engaged in planting. Moore was one of the founders of the first high schools in Spartanburg District. In 1814, he was elected to the Fourteenth Congress, serving again from 1815 to 1817. Afterwards, he resumed engaging in agricultural pursuits. He owned slaves. He died near Moores Station of Spartanburg County, South Carolina, in 1822 and was interred in Moore's Burying Ground.

According to one source, he was the brother of the legendary heroine of Cowpens, Kate Barry.

References

External links

1759 births
1822 deaths
People from Spartanburg County, South Carolina
American people of Scotch-Irish descent
Democratic-Republican Party members of the United States House of Representatives from South Carolina
Members of the South Carolina House of Representatives
Farmers from South Carolina
American planters
American slave owners
United States Army generals
South Carolina militiamen in the American Revolution
United States Army personnel of the War of 1812